Allium koreanum, the Korean rocky chive, is a species of Allium endemic to the Korean Peninsula.

The pyxidium is obtuse, triangular and solid. The bract is broadovate, with a caudate end.

References 

koreanum
Endemic flora of Korea
Plants described in 2004